A number of historic and current Earth (or ground) stations in Australia are used to communicate and track human-made satellites.  
Many of the sites are associated with overseas government partnerships established generally with the United States, European Union, and Japan.  They are generally run by various Australian Government agencies along with NASA, European Space Agency or the US Military.

List of sites

Treaties
A number of treaties and other instruments associated with the stations:

References